The Cam River is a river of New Zealand. It flows north from the Inland Kaikoura Range and is a tributary of the Awatere River.

Cam River is also an alternative name for the Ruataniwha River.

See also
List of rivers of New Zealand

References
Land Information New Zealand - Search for Place Names

Rivers of the Marlborough Region
Rivers of New Zealand